Nigeria Security and Civil Defence Corps (NSCDC) is a paramilitary institution in Nigeria that was first introduced in May 2003 by the Nigerian Government, as the Lagos Civil Defence. The act was amended in 2007 to enhance the statutory duties of the corp.
It was commissioned to provide measures against threat and any form of attack or disaster against the nation and its citizenry. The corps is statutorily empowered by lay Act No. 2 of 2003 and amended by Act 6 of 4 June, 2007.

The Corps is empowered to institute legal proceedings by or in then and of the Attorney General of the Federation in accordance with the provisions of the constitution of the Federal Republic of Nigeria against any person or persons suspected to have committed an offence, maintain an armed squad in order to bear fire arms among others to strengthen the corps in the discharge of its statutory duties.

History 
The NSCDC was first introduced in May 1967 during the Nigerian Civil War within the then Federal Capital Territory of Lagos for the purpose of sensitization and protection of the civil populace. It was then known as Lagos Civil Defence Committee.

It later metamorphosed into the present day NSCDC in 1970. On inception, the Corps had the objective of carrying out some educational and enlightenment campaigns in and around the Federal Capital of Lagos to sensitize members of the civil populace on enemy attacks and how to save themselves from danger as most Nigerians living in and around Lagos territory then had little or no knowledge about war and its implications. Members of the Committee deemed it important to educate through electronic and print media on how to guide themselves during air raids, bomb attacks, identify bombs and how to dive into trenches during bomb blast.

In 1984, the Corps was transformed into a National security outfit and in 1988, there was a major re-structuring of the Corps that led to the establishment of Commands throughout the Federation, including Abuja, and the addition of special functions by the Federal Government.

On 28 June, 2003, an Act to give statutory backing to the NSCDC passed by the National Assembly was signed into law by Chief Olusegun Obasanjo, GCFR, the former president and Commander in chief of the Armed Forces, Federal Republic of Nigeria.

Statutory duties 
The primary function of the NSCDC is to protect lives and properties in conjunction with Nigeria police. One of the crucial function of the corp is to protect pipelines from vandalism. The agency also involves in crisis resolutions.

Many states now recognise the impact of the Nigeria Security and Civil Defence Corps with continuous collaboration to ensure maximum security.

The current Commandant General of the Nigerian Security and Civil Defence Corps is Ahmed Abubakar Audi after Abdullahi Gana retired from service in February 2021.

Ranks 
Officers

Other ranks

Past and present Commandant General 
 Biola Aturamu
 Ade Abolurin
 Abdullahi Gana
 Ahmed Abubakar Audi

References

External links 
 http://www.nscdc.gov.ng/

Military of Nigeria
Government agencies established in 2003
Federal law enforcement agencies of Nigeria
Emergency services in Nigeria